Tadeusz Marek may refer to:

 Tadeusz Marek, pen name of Tadeusz Żakiej (1915–1994), Polish musicologist
 Tadeusz "Tadek" Marek (1908–1982), Polish-British engineer